North West Sydney Spirit Football Club is an Australian professional association football club based in Sydney. The club was formed and admitted into the National Soccer League in 1998.

The list encompasses the records set by the club, their managers and their players. The player records section itemises the club's leading goalscorers and those who have made most appearances in first-team competitions. It also records notable achievements by North West Sydney Spirit players on the international stage. Attendance records in Sydney are also included.

The club's record appearance maker is Paul Henderson, who made 133 appearances between 1998 and 2004. Ben Burgess is North West Sydney Spirit's record goalscorer, scoring 16 goals in total.

Player records

Appearances

Most appearances
Competitive matches only, includes appearances as substitute. Numbers in brackets indicate goals scored.

Goalscorers
 Most goals in a season: Ben Burgess, 16 goals (in the 2000–01 season)

Top goalscorers
Ben Burgess is the top goalscorer for North West Sydney Spirit.

Competitive matches only. Numbers in brackets indicate appearances made.

International

This section refers only to caps won while a North West Sydney Spirit player.
 First capped player: Luke Casserly, for Australia against Chile on 9 February 2000
 Most capped player: Luke Casserly with 4 caps

Club records

Matches
 First National Soccer League match: Northern Spirit 0–2 Sydney Olympic, National Soccer League, 9 October 1998
 Record win:
 4–0 against Marconi Fairfield, National Soccer League, 15 January 1999
 4–0 against Sydney Olympic, National Soccer League, 4 October 2003
 Record defeat: 0–6 against Adelaide Force, National Soccer League, 25 May 2003
 Record consecutive wins: 3
 from 25 October 1998 to 6 November 1998
 from 15 January 1999 to 26 January 1999
 from 4 February 2003 to 16 February 2003
 from 26 October 2003 to 8 November 2003
 Record consecutive defeats: 6, from 14 April 2000 to 15 October 2000
 Record consecutive draws: 3, from 3 December 2000 to 17 December 2000
 Record consecutive matches without a defeat: 6, from 27 December 1998 to 26 January 1999
 Record consecutive matches without a win: 10, from 27 February 2001 to 29 April 2001

Goals
 Most league goals scored in a season: 72 in 26 matches, NSW Division One, 2007
 Fewest league goals scored in a season: 26 in 10 matches, National Premier Leagues NSW 2, 2020
 Most league goals conceded in a season: 58 in 34 matches, National Soccer League, 1999–2000
 Fewest league goals conceded in a season: 16 in 22 matches, National Soccer League, 2015

Points
 Most points in a season: 58 in 26 matches, NSW Division One, 2007
 Fewest points in a season: 22
 in 22 matches, NSW Super League, 2012
 in 10 matches, National Premier Leagues NSW 2, 2020

Attendances
 Highest attendance: 18,985, against Sydney Olympic, National Soccer League, 9 October 1998
 Lowest attendance: 1,004, against Melbourne Knights, National Soccer League, 29 November 2002

References

North West Sydney Spirit